Exosome complex exonuclease MTR3 is an enzyme that in humans is encoded by the EXOSC6 gene.

This gene product constitutes one of the subunits of the multisubunit particle called the exosome complex, which mediates mRNA degradation. The composition of human exosome is similar to its yeast counterpart. This protein is homologous to the yeast Mtr3 protein. Its exact function is not known, however, it has been shown using a cell-free RNA decay system that the exosome is required for rapid degradation of unstable mRNAs containing AU-rich elements (AREs), but not for poly(A) shortening. The exosome does not recognize ARE-containing mRNAs on its own, but requires ARE-binding proteins that could interact with the exosome and recruit it to unstable mRNAs, thereby promoting their rapid degradation.

Interactions
Exosome component 6 has been shown to interact with Exosome component 7,Exosome component 8 and Exosome component 1.

References

Further reading